Eric Alexander (born August 4, 1968) is an American jazz saxophonist.

Early life and education
Alexander was born in Illinois. He began as a classical musician, studying alto saxophone at Indiana University with Eugene Rousseau in 1986. He soon switched to jazz and the tenor saxophone, however, and transferred to William Paterson University, where he studied with Harold Mabern, Rufus Reid, Joe Lovano, Gary Smulyan, Norman Simmons, Steve Turre and others.

Career
Alexander finished second at the 1991 Thelonious Monk International Jazz Saxophone Competition. He was soon signed by a record label.

Alexander has worked with many jazz musicians, including Chicago pianist Harold Mabern, bassist Ron Carter, drummer Idris Muhammad, and guitarist Pat Martino. He is part of Mike LeDonne's Groover Quartet with Peter Bernstein, and Joe Farnsworth. He has recorded and toured extensively with the sextet, One for All.

Discography

As leader

As sideman
With Steve Davis
 The Jaunt (Criss Cross, 1995)
 Dig Deep (Criss Cross, 1996
 Crossfire (Criss Cross, 1997
 Say When (Smoke Sessions, 2015)

With Charles Earland
 Unforgettable (Muse, 1991)
 I Ain't Jivin'...I'm Jammin (Muse, 1992)
 Ready 'n' Able (Muse, 1995)
 Blowing the Blues Away (HighNote, 1997)
 Cookin' with the Mighty Burner (HighNote, 1999; recorded 1997)
 Charles Earland Live (Cannonball, 1999; recorded 1997)
 Stomp! (HighNote, 2000; recorded 1999)
 Charles Earland Tribute Band: Keepers Of The Flame (HighNote, 2002) (includes Joey DeFrancesco, Bob DeVos, Pat Martino)With Joe Farnsworth Beautiful Friendship (Criss Cross, 1998)
 It's Prime Time (Eighty-Eight's, 2003)
 Super Prime Time (Eighty-Eight's, 2011)
 My Heroes (Tribute to the Legends) (Venus, 2014)With David Hazeltine Blues Quarters, Vol. 1 (Criss Cross, 1998)
 The Classic Trio Meets Eric Alexander (Sharp Nine, 2001)
 Manhattan Autumn (Sharp Nine, 2001)
 Blues Quarters, Vol. 2 (Criss Cross, 2006)
 The Inspiration Suite (Sharp Nine, 2007)
 Inversions (Criss Cross, 2010)With Vincent Herring The Battle (Live at Smoke) (HighNote, 2005)
 Friendly Fire (Live at Smoke) (HighNote, 2011)
 In The Spirit of Coltrane and Cannonball (Yanagisawa, 2012)With Randy Johnston Jubilation (Muse, 1992 [rel. 1994])
 In A-Chord (Muse, 1994 [rel. 1995])With Mike LeDonne Then & Now (Double-Time, 1999) (quintet with Jim Rotondi)
 Smokin' Out Loud (Savant, 2004)
 You'll See! (Live at The Cellar) (Cellar Live, 2004)
 On Fire (Live at Smoke) (Savant, 2006)
 Five Live (Live at Smoke) (Savant, 2007) (quintet with Jeremy Pelt)
 The Groover (Savant, 2009)
 Keep the Faith (Savant, 2011)
 I Love Music (Savant, 2013)
 Awwl Right! (Savant, 2015)
 That Feelin (Savant, 2016)
 From the Heart (Savant, 2018)
 It's All Your Fault (Savant, 2021)
 The Heavy Hitters (Cellar Live, 2023) (sextet with Jeremy Pelt, Vincent Herring)With Harold Mabern Kiss of Fire (Venus, 2001)
 Mr. Lucky (A Tribute to Sammy Davis Jr.) (HighNote, 2012)
 Afro Blue (Smoke Sessions, 2015)
 To Love and Be Loved (Smoke Sessions, 2017)
 The Iron Man: Live at Smoke (Smoke Sessions, 2018)
 Mabern Plays Mabern (Smoke Sessions, 2018 [rel. 2020])
 Mabern Plays Coltrane (Smoke Sessions, 2018 [rel. 2021])With Jimmy McGriffMcGriff's House Party (Milestone, 1999)With New York All-StarsBurnin' In London (Ubuntu Music, 2017) (quartet with Harold Mabern)
Live Encounter (Ubuntu Music, 2018) (sextet with Seamus Blake, Mike LeDonne)With One for All (co-leader with Jim Rotondi, Steve Davis, David Hazeltine, Joe Farnsworth) Too Soon to Tell (Sharp Nine, 1997)
 Optimism (Sharp Nine, 1998)
 Upward and Onward (Criss Cross, 1999)
 The Long Haul (Criss Cross, 2000)
 The End of a Love Affair (Venus, 2001)
 Live at Smoke, Volume 1 (Criss Cross, 2001)
 Wide Horizons (Criss Cross, 2002)
 No Problem: Tribute to Art Blakey (Venus, 2003) 
 Blueslike (Criss Cross, 2003)
 Killer Joe (Venus, 2005) 
 The Lineup (Sharp Nine, 2006)
 What's Going On (Venus, 2007) 
 Return of the Lineup (Sharp Nine, 2008)
 Incorrigible (Jazz Legacy Productions, 2009)
 Invades Vancouver! (Live at The Cellar) (Cellar Live, 2010)
 The Third Decade (Smoke Sessions, 2016)With Cecil PayneCerupa (Delmark, 1993 [rel. 1995])
Scotch and Milk (Delmark, 1996)
Payne's Window (Delmark, 1998)With Reeds and Deeds (co-leader with Grant Stewart)'''
 Wailin (Criss Cross, 2004)
 Cookin' (Criss Cross, 2005)
 Tenor Time (Criss Cross, 2010)

With Irene Reid
 Million Dollar Secret (Savant, 1997)
 I Ain't Doing Too Bad (Savant, 1999)
 The Uptown Lowdown (Savant, 2000) 
 One Monkey Don't Stop No Show (Savant, 2002)

With Jim Rotondi
 Introducing Jim Rotondi (Criss Cross, 1996)
 Jim's Bop (Criss Cross, 1997) 
 Excursions (Criss Cross, 1998) 
 Blues for Brother Ray (Posi-Tone, 2009)
 Live at Smalls (Smalls Live, 2009)
 Hard Hittin' at the Bird's Eye (Sharp Nine, 2012)

With Larry WillisThe Offering (HighNote, 2008)

With others
 The Tenor Triangle: Tell It Like It Is (Criss Cross, 1993) (sextet with Ralph Lalama, Tad Shull, and the Melvin Rhyne Trio)
 Joe Magnarelli: Why Not (Criss Cross, 1994)
 The Tenor Triangle: Aztec Blues (Criss Cross, 1994) (sextet with Ralph Lalama, Tad Shull, and the Melvin Rhyne Trio)
 Robert Mazurek: Badlands (Hep, 1995)
 Melvin Rhyne: Stick to the Kick (Criss Cross, 1995) (quintet includes Ryan Kisor, Peter Bernstein)
 John Swana: In the Moment (Criss Cross, 1995) (sextet includes Steve Davis, Kenny Barron)
 Atro "Wade" Mikkola Quartet: On The Way (AMK [Finland], 1995)
 Peter Bernstein: Brain Dance (Criss Cross, 1996) (quintet includes Steve Davis, Larry Goldings)
 Robert Mazurek: Green & Blue (Hep, 1996)
 Mark Elf: A Minor Scramble (Jen Bay, 1996)
 Michael Weiss: Power Station (DIW, 1997)
 Dave Specter & Lenny Lynn: Blues Spoken Here (Delmark, 1998)
 Pat Martino: Stone Blue (Blue Note, 1998)
 John Swana & Joe Magnarelli: Philly-New York Junction (Criss Cross, 1998)
 Paul Bollenback: Soul Grooves (Challenge, 1998)
 Yoron Israel Connection: Live at the Blue Note (Half Note, 1998) 
 Melvin Rhyne: Classmasters (Criss Cross, 1999) (quartet includes Peter Bernstein) 
 Norman Simmons: The Art of Norman Simmons (Savant, 2000) (quintet includes Henry Johnson)
 Mads Baerentzen Trio Featuring Eric Alexander: 785 Madison Ave. (Music Mecca, 2000)
 Dmitri Kolesnik: Blues for Dad (Boheme, 2001)
 Jimmy Scott: But Beautiful (Milestone, 2001)
 Jimmy Scott: Moon Glow (Milestone, 2001)
 Ryan Kisor: The Dream (Criss Cross, 2001)
 Norman Simmons: Synthesis (Savant, 2002) (quintet includes Henry Johnson)
 Junior Mance Trio & Eric Alexander: Groovin' Blues (M & I, 2002)
 Joe Magnarelli & John Swana: New York-Philly Junction (Criss Cross, 2003)
 Jimmy Cobb's Mob: Cobb's Groove (Milestone, 2003) (quintet with Richard Wyands, Peter Bernstein, John Webber)
 Simone [Kopmajer] (with Romantic Jazz Trio and Eric Alexander): Romance (Venus, 2004)
 Jim Snidero: Close Up (Milestone, 2004)
 Freddy Cole: This Love of Mine (HighNote, 2005)
 Terry Gibbs: Feelin' Good – Live in Studio (Mack Avenue, 2005) (sextet includes Joey DeFrancesco)
 Bob DeVos: Shifting Sands (Savant, 2005)
 Bob DeVos: Playing for Keeps (Savant, 2007)
 Dmitri Kolesnik: Five Corners (Challenge, 2007)
 John Swana: Bright Moments (Criss Cross, 2007)
 Dave O'Higgins Quintet Featuring Eric Alexander: Sketchbook (Jazzizit, 2008)
 Stewy Von Wattenwyl Generations Trio Featuring Eric Alexander: Live at Marians (Bemsha Music, 2008)
 Meeting Point: Quintessence (Challenge, 2008) (quintet with Jim Rotondi, Andrei Kondakov, Dmitri Kolesnik, Lenny White)
 Neal Smith Quintet: Live at Smalls (Smalls Live, 2009)
 Pat Martino Quartet: Undeniable: Live at Blues Alley (HighNote, 2011)
 Alexis Cole (with One for All): You'd Be So Nice to Come Home To (Venus, 2011)
 I Carry Your Heart: Alexis Cole Sings Pepper Adams (Motéma, 2012)
 Dee Daniels: State of the Art (Criss Cross, 2013) (quartet includes Cyrus Chestnut)
 Dena DeRose: We Won't Forget You...An Homage To Shirley Horn (HighNote, 2014) (with Jeremy Pelt, Gary Smulyan)
 Federico Bonifazi: You'll See (Steeplechase, 2015)
 Bernd Reiter Quintet Featuring Eric Alexander: Workout at Bird's Eye (A Tribute to Hank Mobley & Grant Green) (Steeplechase, 2015)
 The Candy Men: Harry Allen's All Star New York Saxophone Band (Arbors, 2015) (with Grant Stewart, Gary Smulyan)
 Andrew Dickeson With Eric Alexander: Is That So (Andrew Dickeson Productions, 2017)
 David Kikoski: Phoenix Rising (HighNote, 2019)
 Cory Weeds: O Sole Mio! Music From The Motherland (Cellar Live, 2019 [rel. 2021])
 Michael Weiss: Persistence (Cellar Live, 2022)
 Caesar Frazier: Tenacity / As We Speak'' (Track Merchant, 2022)

References

Further reading

External links
 
 JazzPolice.com review of Eric Alexander's "It's All in the Game"

1968 births
Living people
American jazz tenor saxophonists
American male saxophonists
Musicians from Olympia, Washington
Milestone Records artists
HighNote Records artists
Criss Cross Jazz artists
Delmark Records artists
William Paterson University alumni
21st-century American saxophonists
21st-century American male musicians
American male jazz musicians
One for All (band) members
Venus Records artists